The National Iranian Oil Company (NIOC) is a government-owned national oil and natural gas producer and distributor under the direction of the Ministry of Petroleum of Iran. NIOC was established in 1948 and restructured under The Consortium Agreement of 1954. NIOC ranks as the world's second largest oil company, after Saudi Arabia's state-owned Aramco.

The NIOC is exclusively responsible for the exploration, drilling, production, distribution and export of crude oil, as well as exploration, extraction and sales of natural gas and liquefied natural gas (LNG). NIOC exports its surplus production according to commercial considerations determined by the OPEC and at the prices prevalent in the international markets. Iran's overall export crude oil was valued at US$85 billion in 2010.

History

Background: 1901–1951

In May 1901, William Knox D'Arcy was granted a concession by the Shah of Iran to search for oil, which he discovered in May 1908. This was the first commercially significant find in the Middle East. In 1923, Burmah Oil employed future Prime Minister, Winston Churchill as a paid consultant; to lobby the British government to allow the Anglo-Persian Oil Company (APOC) to have exclusive rights to Persian oil resources, which were successfully granted. 

In 1935, Rezā Shāh requested the international community to refer to Persia as 'Iran', which was reflected in the name change of the Anglo-Persian Oil Company (APOC) to the Anglo-Iranian Oil Company (AIOC). Following World War II, Iranian nationalism was on the rise, especially surrounding the Iranian natural resources being exploited by the foreign companies without adequately compensating Iranian taxpayers. AIOC and the pro western Iranian government led by Prime Minister Ali Razmara, initially resisted nationalist pressure to revise AIOC's concession terms still further in Iran's favour. In March 1951, Ali Razmara was assassinated; and Mohammed Mossadeq, a nationalist, was elected as the new prime minister by the Majlis of Iran.

NIOC: 1951–1979

In April 1951, the Majlis nationalized the Iranian oil industry by a unanimous vote, and the National Iranian Oil Company (NIOC) was formed, displacing the AIOC. The AIOC withdrew its management from Iran and organised an effective worldwide embargo of Iranian oil. The British government, which owned the AIOC, contested the nationalization at the International Court of Justice at The Hague, but its complaint was dismissed.

By the spring of 1953, incoming US President Dwight D. Eisenhower authorised the Central Intelligence Agency (CIA), to organise a coup against the Mossadeq government, the 1953 Iranian coup d'état. In August 1953, the coup brought pro-Western general Fazlollah Zahedi to power as the new PM, along with the return to Iran of the Shah Mohammad Reza Pahlavi from his brief exile in Italy. The anti-Mossadeq plan was orchestrated by the CIA under the code-name Operation Ajax, and by the British SIS (MI6) as Operation Boot.

In 1954, the AIOC became British Petroleum. The return of the shah had not meant that British Petroleum was able to monopolise Iranian oil as before. Under pressure from United States, British Petroleum reluctantly accepted membership in a consortium of companies, founded in October 1954, to bring back Iranian oil to the international market. It was incorporated in London as a holding company called Iranian Oil Participants (IOP). The founding members of IOP included British Petroleum (40%), Gulf (later Chevron, 8%), Royal Dutch Shell (14%), and Compagnie Française des Pétroles (later Total, 6%). The four Aramco partners – Standard Oil of California (SoCal, later Chevron) – Standard Oil of New Jersey (later Exxon, then ExxonMobil) – Standard Oil Co. of New York (later Mobil, then ExxonMobil) – Texaco (later Chevron) – each held an 8% stake in the holding company.

All IOP members acknowledged that NIOC owned the oil and facilities in Iran, and IOP's role was to operate and manage them on behalf of NIOC. To facilitate that, IOP established two operating entities incorporated in the Netherlands, and both were delegated to NIOC. Similar to the Saudi-Aramco "50/50" agreement of 1950, the IOP consortium agreed to share profits on a 50–50 basis with Iran, "but not to open its books to Iranian auditors or to allow Iranians onto its board of directors". The negotiations leading to the creation of the consortium, during 1954–55, were considered a feat of skillful diplomacy.

In Iran, IOP continued to operate until the Islamic Revolution in 1979. The new regime of Ayatollah Khomeini confiscated all of the company's assets in Iran. According to the IOP's Web site: The victory of the Islamic revolution annulled the Consortium Agreement of 1954 and all regulations pertaining to it. The revolution led to the withdrawal or expulsion of virtually all foreign employees from the oil industry with the new Iranian government assuming full control of its affairs.

NIOC's Oil Reserves

After 2003 Iran made some significant discoveries which led to addition of another  of oil to the recoverable reserves of Iran.

The vast majority of Iran's crude oil reserves are located in giant onshore fields in the south-western Khuzestan region near the Iraqi border. Overall, Iran has 40 producing fields – 27 onshore and 13 offshore. Iran's crude oil is generally medium in sulfur and in the 28°-35 °API range.

As at 2012, 98 rigs are in operation in onshore fields, 24 in offshore fields and a single rig is in operation in the Caspian Sea. Iran plans to increase the number of its drilling rigs operating in its onshore and offshore oilfields by 36 units to reach 134 units by March 2014.

Table 1- The biggest NIOC oil fields;

Strategic petroleum reserves

The storage capacity of oil products in the country is around 11.5 billion liters (2011), but it will reach 16.7 billion liters by the end of the Fifth Five Year Development Plan (2010–2015). As of 2012, Iran is capable of storing crude oil in the Persian Gulf for a period of 10–12 days. The figure should hit 30–40 days after the construction of new storage facilities are completed.

Gas reserves

It stands for world's second largest reserves after Russia.

NIOC's ten biggest Non-Associated Gas Fields;

Recent discoveries

Organizational structure

The company is completely owned by Iranian government. NIOC's General Assembly (GA) consists of:
 The President
 Vice President
 Director General of the Management and Planning Organization
 Minister of Petroleum
 Minister of Energy
 Minister of Industries and Mines
 Minister of Labor and Social Affairs
 Minister of Economy and Finance

The GA is its highest decision-making body, determining the company's general policy guide lines, and approving the annual budgets, operations and financial statements and balance sheets. The company's board of directors has the authority and major responsibilities to approve the operational schemes within the general framework ratified by the General Assembly, approve transactions and contracts, and prepare budgets and Board reports and annual balance sheets for presentation to the General Assembly.

The Board supervises the implementation of general policy guidelines defined by the General Assembly, and pursues executive operations via the company's Managing Director.

Members of the board

Subsidiary companies

With appropriate division of tasks and delegation of responsibilities to subsidiaries- affiliates, NIOC has been able to establish acceptable degrees of coordination within its
organizational set up. In fact, NIOC's Directors act primarily in policy making and supervision while subsidiaries act as their executive arm in coordinating an array of operations such as exploration, drilling, production and delivery of crude oil and natural gas, for export and domestic consumption.

The NIOC's subsidiaries are as follows:

Production costs and investments

The cost of producing each barrel will rise to $30 or more from $7 in 2012.

Iran currently allocates $20 billion a year to develop fields and $10 billion on maintaining output. In the next decade, maintaining production will cost $50 billion, with a similar sum required for development. This does not include development and investment costs in related fields such as Petrochemicals.

NIOC's major domestic contractors

Although usually neglected and overlooked, Iran also has a number of very active private companies in the oil sector. The growing private sector activity is mainly active in projects involving the construction of oil field units, refinery equipment, tanks and pipelines, as well as engineering. Iranian manufacturers will supply oil industry with $10 billion worth of domestically made goods and equipment in 2012.

NIOC produces 60–70% of its industrial equipment domestically including towers, reactors, various turbines, refineries, oil tankers, oil rigs, offshore platforms, valves, pipelines, generators and exploration instruments. Iran is also cooperating with foreign companies to transfer technology to Iranian oil industry. The objective is to become self-sufficient by 85% before 2015. The strategic goods include onshore and offshore drilling rigs, pumps, turbines and precision tools. Domestic production of 52 petrochemical catalysts will be started in 2013.

In 2019, the government sub-contracted projects worth 6.2 billion to domestic contractors. Pending projects include domestication of wellhead equipment, desalinating packages, anti-corrosions, sulfur recovery catalysts, wellhead control panels, among others. According to NIOC in 2019, Iran was manufacturing 12,000 components and complicated equipment of the petroleum industry.

In 2021, Iran announced that 820 domestic firms, including 182 knowledge-based, have manufactured 85% of the parts or equipments needed by the oil and gas sector, worth some $5 billion. The companies have generated some 80,000 and 250,000 jobs directly and indirectly, respectively.

Participations in foreign gas fields

 Iran owns 50% of the offshore gas field of Rhum in the North Sea, which is Britain's largest untapped gas field. It is a joint-venture with BP worth $1 million a day at 15 June 2010 spot prices.
 Iran has another 10% joint-venture participation with BP and other foreign oil companies in Azerbaijani Shah Deniz gas field, producing 8 billion cubic meters of gas per year, worth up to a reported $2.4 billion per year. The Iranian entity with which BP has partnered in these ventures is the Swiss-based Naftiran Intertrade, a subsidiary of NIOC.

Environmental record

See also

 The nationalization of the Iran oil industry movement
 International rankings of Iran
 Petroleum industry in Iran
 Ministry of Petroleum of Iran
 National Iranian Gas Company
 National Iranian Petrochemical Company
 National Iranian Oil Refining and Distribution Company
 Economy of Iran
 Iranian oil bourse
 Foreign Direct Investment in Iran
 Privatization in Iran
 Eilat Ashkelon Pipeline Company – used to be 50% in control of NIOC and the focus of a dispute between Israel and Iran.
 William Knox D'Arcy

References

Further reading

External links

 NIOC – official website 
 National Iranian Oil Company's Information Center & Central Library

 
Iranian brands
Non-renewable resource companies established in 1951
Iran
Government-owned companies of Iran
Companies based in Tehran
Iranian companies established in 1951